The 1991 Fresno State Bulldogs baseball team represented Fresno State College in the 1991 NCAA Division I baseball season. The Bulldogs played their home games at Pete Beiden Field. The team was coached by Bob Bennett in his 24th year as head coach at Fresno State.

The Bulldogs won the West I Regional to advance to the College World Series, where they were defeated by the Florida Gators.

Roster

Schedule

|-
! style="" | Regular Season
|-

|-
! bgcolor="#DDDDFF" width="3%" | #
! bgcolor="#DDDDFF" width="7%" | Date
! bgcolor="#DDDDFF" width="14%" | Opponent
! bgcolor="#DDDDFF" width="25%" | Site/Stadium
! bgcolor="#DDDDFF" width="5%" | Score
! bgcolor="#DDDDFF" width="5%" | Overall Record
! bgcolor="#DDDDFF" width="5%" | Big West Record
|- align="center" bgcolor="#ccffcc"
| 1 || February 3 ||  || Pete Beiden Field • Fresno, California || 5–2 || 1–0 || –
|- align="center" bgcolor="#ccffcc"
| 2 || February 3 || San Diego || Pete Beiden Field • Fresno, California || 12–2 || 2–0 || –
|- align="center" bgcolor="#ccffcc"
| 3 || February 5 ||  || Pete Beiden Field • Fresno, California || 10–6 || 3–0 || –
|- align="center" bgcolor="#ccffcc"
| 4 || February 8 || at  || Sunken Diamond • Stanford, California || 7–1 || 4–0 || –
|- align="center" bgcolor="#ccffcc"
| 5 || February 9 || at Stanford || Sunken Diamond • Stanford, California || 5–4 || 5–0 || –
|- align="center" bgcolor="#ffcccc"
| 6 || February 10 || at Stanford || Sunken Diamond • Stanford, California || 3–6 || 5–1 || –
|- align="center" bgcolor="#ccffcc"
| 7 || February 12 ||  || Pete Beiden Field • Fresno, California || 5–3 || 6–1 || –
|- align="center" bgcolor="#ccffcc"
| 8 || February 13 || at San Diego || Pete Beiden Field • Fresno, California || 7–1 || 7–1 || –
|- align="center" bgcolor="#ffcccc"
| 9 || February 15 ||  || Pete Beiden Field • Fresno, California || 8–10 || 7–2 || –
|- align="center" bgcolor="#ffcccc"
| 10 || February 16 || California || Pete Beiden Field • Fresno, California || 14–15 || 7–3 || –
|- align="center" bgcolor="#ccffcc"
| 11 || February 17 || California || Pete Beiden Field • Fresno, California || 17–9 || 8–3 || –
|- align="center" bgcolor="#ccffcc"
| 12 || February 19 ||  || Pete Beiden Field • Fresno, California || 6–5 || 9–3 || –
|- align="center" bgcolor="#ffcccc"
| 13 || February 22 || at  || Rainbow Stadium • Honolulu, Hawaii || 8–9 || 9–4 || –
|- align="center" bgcolor="#ffcccc"
| 14 || February 23 || at Hawaii || Rainbow Stadium • Honolulu, Hawaii || 4–5 || 9–5 || –
|- align="center" bgcolor="#ccffcc"
| 15 || February 24 || at Hawaii || Rainbow Stadium • Honolulu, Hawaii || 17–8 || 10–5 || –
|-

|-
! bgcolor="#DDDDFF" width="3%" | #
! bgcolor="#DDDDFF" width="7%" | Date
! bgcolor="#DDDDFF" width="14%" | Opponent
! bgcolor="#DDDDFF" width="25%" | Site/Stadium
! bgcolor="#DDDDFF" width="5%" | Score
! bgcolor="#DDDDFF" width="5%" | Overall Record
! bgcolor="#DDDDFF" width="5%" | Big West Record
|- align="center" bgcolor="#ccffcc"
| 16 || March 2 ||  || Pete Beiden Field • Fresno, California || 4–0 || 11–5 || –
|- align="center" bgcolor="#ccffcc"
| 17 || March 2 || New Mexico State || Pete Beiden Field • Fresno, California || 5–4 || 12–5 || –
|- align="center" bgcolor="#ccffcc"
| 18 || March 7 ||  || Pete Beiden Field • Fresno, California || 5–0 || 13–5 || –
|- align="center" bgcolor="#ffcccc"
| 19 || March 8 || St. Mary's || Pete Beiden Field • Fresno, California || 9–13 || 13–6 || –
|- align="center" bgcolor="#ccffcc"
| 20 || March 9 || St. Mary's || Pete Beiden Field • Fresno, California || 10–4 || 14–6 || –
|- align="center" bgcolor="#ccffcc"
| 21 || March 11 ||  || Pete Beiden Field • Fresno, California || 5–3 || 15–6 || –
|- align="center" bgcolor="#ccffcc"
| 22 || March 12 ||  || Pete Beiden Field • Fresno, California || 9–5 || 16–6 || –
|- align="center" bgcolor="#ffcccc"
| 23 || March 13 ||  || Pete Beiden Field • Fresno, California || 4–5 || 16–7 || –
|- align="center" bgcolor="#ffcccc"
| 24 || March 15 ||  || Pete Beiden Field • Fresno, California || 0–4 || 16–8 || –
|- align="center" bgcolor="#ffcccc"
| 25 || March 15 ||  || Pete Beiden Field • Fresno, California || 1–4 || 16–9 || –
|- align="center" bgcolor="#ccffcc"
| 26 || March 16 || Iowa State || Pete Beiden Field • Fresno, California || 4–2 || 17–9 || –
|- align="center" bgcolor="#ccffcc"
| 27 || March 21 ||  || Pete Beiden Field • Fresno, California || 3–1 || 18–9 || –
|- align="center" bgcolor="#ffcccc"
| 28 || March 22 || Oregon State || Pete Beiden Field • Fresno, California || 3–9 || 18–10 || –
|- align="center" bgcolor="#ffcccc"
| 29 || March 23 || Oregon State || Pete Beiden Field • Fresno, California || 2–5 || 18–11 || –
|- align="center" bgcolor="#ccffcc"
| 30 || March 28 || at  || Billy Hebert Field • Stockton, California || 6–1 || 19–11 || 1–0
|- align="center" bgcolor="#ccffcc"
| 31 || March 29 || at Pacific || Billy Hebert Field • Stockton, California || 6–3 || 20–11 || 2–0
|- align="center" bgcolor="#ccffcc"
| 32 || March 30 || at Pacific || Billy Hebert Field • Stockton, California || 18–2 || 21–11 || 3–0
|-

|-
! bgcolor="#DDDDFF" width="3%" | #
! bgcolor="#DDDDFF" width="7%" | Date
! bgcolor="#DDDDFF" width="14%" | Opponent
! bgcolor="#DDDDFF" width="25%" | Site/Stadium
! bgcolor="#DDDDFF" width="5%" | Score
! bgcolor="#DDDDFF" width="5%" | Overall Record
! bgcolor="#DDDDFF" width="5%" | Big West Record
|- align="center" bgcolor="#ccffcc"
| 33 || April 5 || at  || Anteater Field • Irvine, California || 4–1 || 22–11 || 4–0
|- align="center" bgcolor="#ccffcc"
| 34 || April 6 || at UC Irvine || Anteater Field • Irvine, California || 8–2 || 23–11 || 5–0
|- align="center" bgcolor="#ccffcc"
| 35 || April 7 || at UC Irvine || Anteater Field • Irvine, California || 6–3 || 24–11 || 6–0
|- align="center" bgcolor="#ffcccc"
| 36 || April 9 || Cal Poly || Pete Beiden Field • Fresno, California || 7–8 || 24–12 || 6–0
|- align="center" bgcolor="#ccffcc"
| 37 || April 12 ||  || Pete Beiden Field • Fresno, California || 1–0 || 25–12 || 7–0
|- align="center" bgcolor="#ccffcc"
| 38 || April 13 || Cal State Fullerton || Pete Beiden Field • Fresno, California || 6–4 || 26–12 || 8–0
|- align="center" bgcolor="#ffcccc"
| 39 || April 14 || Cal State Fullerton || Pete Beiden Field • Fresno, California || 5–20 || 26–13 || 8–1
|- align="center" bgcolor="#ccffcc"
| 40 || April 16 ||  || Pete Beiden Field • Fresno, California || 4–3 || 27–13 || 8–1
|- align="center" bgcolor="#ccffcc"
| 41 || April 19 || at  || San Jose Municipal Stadium • San Jose, California || 4–0 || 28–13 || 9–1
|- align="center" bgcolor="#ffcccc"
| 42 || April 20 || at San Jose State || San Jose Municipal Stadium • San Jose, California || 0–1 || 28–14 || 9–2
|- align="center" bgcolor="#ccffcc"
| 43 || April 21 || at San Jose State || San Jose Municipal Stadium • San Jose, California || 9–1 || 29–14 || 10–2
|- align="center" bgcolor="#ffcccc"
| 44 || April 22 || at  || William Peccole Park • Reno, Nevada || 4–7 || 29–15 || 10–2
|- align="center" bgcolor="#ccffcc"
| 45 || April 23 || at Nevada || William Peccole Park • Reno, Nevada || 11–6 || 30–15 || 10–2
|- align="center" bgcolor="#ccffcc"
| 46 || April 26 ||  || Pete Beiden Field • Fresno, California || 6–1 || 31–15 || 11–2
|- align="center" bgcolor="#ccffcc"
| 47 || April 27 || UNLV || Pete Beiden Field • Fresno, California || 8–5 || 32–15 || 12–2
|- align="center" bgcolor="#ccffcc"
| 48 || April 28 || UNLV || Pete Beiden Field • Fresno, California || 11–7 || 33–15 || 13–2
|-

|-
! bgcolor="#DDDDFF" width="3%" | #
! bgcolor="#DDDDFF" width="7%" | Date
! bgcolor="#DDDDFF" width="14%" | Opponent
! bgcolor="#DDDDFF" width="25%" | Site/Stadium
! bgcolor="#DDDDFF" width="5%" | Score
! bgcolor="#DDDDFF" width="5%" | Overall Record
! bgcolor="#DDDDFF" width="5%" | Big West Record
|- align="center" bgcolor="#ccffcc"
| 49 || May 3 || at  || Blair Field • Long Beach, California || 2–1 || 34–15 || 14–2
|- align="center" bgcolor="#ffcccc"
| 50 || May 4 || at Long Beach State || Blair Field • Long Beach, California || 2–6 || 34–16 || 14–3
|- align="center" bgcolor="#ffcccc"
| 51 || May 5 || at Long Beach State || Blair Field • Long Beach, California || 2–6 || 34–17 || 14–4
|- align="center" bgcolor="#ccffcc"
| 52 || May 10 ||  || Pete Beiden Field • Fresno, California || 10–6 || 35–17 || 15–4
|- align="center" bgcolor="#ffcccc"
| 53 || May 11 || UC Santa Barbara || Pete Beiden Field • Fresno, California || 13–14 || 35–18 || 15–5
|- align="center" bgcolor="#ffcccc"
| 54 || May 12 || UC Santa Barbara || Pete Beiden Field • Fresno, California || 3–8 || 35–19 || 15–6
|- align="center" bgcolor="#ccffcc"
| 55 || May 16||  || Pete Beiden Field • Fresno, California || 8–6 || 36–19 || 15–6
|- align="center" bgcolor="#ffcccc"
| 56 || May 17 || Southwestern Louisiana || Pete Beiden Field • Fresno, California || 3–9 || 36–20 || 15–6
|- align="center" bgcolor="#ccffcc"
| 57 || May 18 || Southwestern Louisiana || Pete Beiden Field • Fresno, California || 10–1 || 37–20 || 15–6
|-

|-
! style="" | Postseason
|-

|-
! bgcolor="#DDDDFF" width="3%" | #
! bgcolor="#DDDDFF" width="7%" | Date
! bgcolor="#DDDDFF" width="14%" | Opponent
! bgcolor="#DDDDFF" width="25%" | Site/Stadium
! bgcolor="#DDDDFF" width="5%" | Score
! bgcolor="#DDDDFF" width="5%" | Overall Record
! bgcolor="#DDDDFF" width="5%" | Big West Record
|- align="center" bgcolor="#ccffcc"
| 58 || May 23 || Cal State Northridge || Pete Beiden Field • Fresno, California || 7–2 || 38–20 || 15–6
|- align="center" bgcolor="#ccffcc"
| 59 || May 24 || Stanford || Pete Beiden Field • Fresno, California || 4–2 || 39–20 || 15–6
|- align="center" bgcolor="#ccffcc"
| 60 || May 25 || Stanford || Pete Beiden Field • Fresno, California || 7–2 || 40–20 || 15–6
|- align="center" bgcolor="#ffcccc"
| 61 || May 26 || Cal State Northridge || Pete Beiden Field • Fresno, California || 2–6 || 40–21 || 15–6
|- align="center" bgcolor="#ccffcc"
| 62 || May 26 || Cal State Northridge || Pete Beiden Field • Fresno, California || 6–5 || 41–21 || 15–6
|-

|-
! bgcolor="#DDDDFF" width="3%" | #
! bgcolor="#DDDDFF" width="7%" | Date
! bgcolor="#DDDDFF" width="14%" | Opponent
! bgcolor="#DDDDFF" width="25%" | Site/Stadium
! bgcolor="#DDDDFF" width="5%" | Score
! bgcolor="#DDDDFF" width="5%" | Overall Record
! bgcolor="#DDDDFF" width="5%" | Big West Record
|- align="center" bgcolor="#ccffcc"
| 63 || May 31 || vs Florida State || Johnny Rosenblatt Stadium • Omaha, Nebraska || 6–3 || 42–21 || 15–6
|- align="center" bgcolor="#ffcccc"
| 64 || June 2 || vs LSU || Johnny Rosenblatt Stadium • Omaha, Nebraska || 3–15 || 42–22 || 15–6
|- align="center" bgcolor="#ffcccc"
| 65 || June 4 || vs  || Johnny Rosenblatt Stadium • Omaha, Nebraska || 1–2 || 42–23 || 15–6
|-

|-
|

Awards and honors
Todd Johnson
First Team All-Big West

Bobby Jones
First Team All-American American Baseball Coaches Association
First Team All-American Collegiate Baseball Newspaper
First Team All-American Baseball America
Rotary Smith Award
Collegiate Baseball Player of the Year
First Team All-West II Regional
First Team All-Big West
Big West Pitcher of the Year

Mike Noel
Second Team All-Big West

Phil Romero
Second Team All-Big West

Jason Wood
Third Team All-American American Baseball Coaches Association
First Team All-West II Regional
First Team All-Big West

References

Fresno State Bulldogs baseball seasons
Fresno State Bulldogs baseball
College World Series seasons
Fresno State
Big West Conference baseball champion seasons